Petite Evander was a New Zealand bred Standardbred trotting racemare. She developed into a successful racehorse, winning races in New Zealand, Australia and the United States, and was the dam of dual Inter Dominion Trotting Championship winner Pride Of Petite. As a notable champion, she was inducted into the New Zealand Trotting Hall of Fame with other immortals.

See also
 Harness racing in New Zealand
 Easton Light
 Lyell Creek
 Take A Moment

Reference list

External links
Petite Evander stars in America and Europe

New Zealand standardbred racehorses
Harness racing in the United States
Individual mares
Inter Dominion winners
New Zealand Trotting Hall of Fame horses
1970 racehorse births